Kraków Voivodeship was a unit of administrative division and local government in Poland in years 1919–1939. It occupied a large area of the southern part of the country, including such cities as Kraków, Jaworzno and Tarnów. Its capital city was Kraków.

Location and area
In early 1939, Voivodeship's area was 17,560 square kilometers. It was located in southern Poland, bordering Autonomous Silesian Voivodeship to the west, Kielce Voivodeship to the north, Lublin Voivodeship, Lwów Voivodeship to the east and Slovakia to the south. Landscape was hilly in the northern part and mountainous in south, with the Tatra Mountains located in the very south of the area. Forests covered 20.9%, with the national average 22.2% (as for January 1, 1937).

Population
According to the 1931 Polish census, the population was 2,300,100, with approximately 25% living in towns and cities. Poles were 91.3% of the population, Jews were 5.6%, and Ukrainians were 2.5%. The Jews preferred to live in the cities and towns; in 1931 they made 19.2% of Voivodeship's city inhabitants. Illiteracy (in 1931) was 13.7%, lower than the national average of 23.1%. In early 1939, population density of the province was 130 people per sq. kilometer, which was much higher than Poland's average of 83.

Industry
Kraków Voivodeship was very divided in industrial terms. Its western part, with such cities as Jaworzno, Chrzanów or Trzebinia, was to a large degree industrialized and urbanized, with some coalmines. Also Kraków and Tarnów were big industrial centers. The eastern part, on the other hand, was backward, with little industry and underdeveloped agriculture. In mid-1930s Polish government started a huge public works program, called Centralny Okręg Przemysłowy (COP), which was a great boost to overpopulated and poor central and eastern counties.

The province was unofficially divided into three regions: southern (tourist), western (industrial), and eastern, with its developing industry of the COP. In 1938, the voivodeship was visited by 217,000 tourists. In early 1939, local government began a program of creation of three model tourist villages: Sol in Zywiec County, Tymbark in Limanowa County, and Szymbark in Gorlice County. Furthermore, regulation of the Vistula began in 1938, with levees built along its shores. The road connecting Kraków with Zakopane was to be completed by the end of 1939, after which funds were to be assigned to modernization of the main road from Kraków to Lwow. Due to the outbreak of World War II, none of the projects were finished.

Cities and administrative divisions

In 1938, the Kraków Voivodeship consisted of 18 powiats (counties). These were as follows:

 Biala Krakowska county (area 635 km², population 139,100),
 Bochnia county (area 877 km², population 113,800),
 Brzesko county (area 849 km², population 102,200),
 Chrzanów county (area 722 km², population 138,100),
 Dąbrowa Tarnowska county (area 650 km², population 66,700),
 Dębica county (area 1 141 km², population 110,900),
 Gorlice county (area 1 082 km², population 104,800),
 Jasło county (area 1 055 km², population 116,100),
 city of Kraków county (powiat krakowski grodzki), (area 48 km², population 219,300),
 Kraków county (area 884 km², population 187,500),
 Limanowa county (area 944 km², population 87,300),
 Mielec county (area 901 km², population 77,500),
 Myślenice county (area 988 km², population 102,700),
 Nowy Sącz county (area 1 572 km², population 183,900),
 Nowy Targ county (area 2 069 km², population 131,800),
 Tarnów county (area 881 km², population 142,400),
 Wadowice county (area 1 109 km², population 145,100),
 Żywiec county (area 1 337 km², population 130,900).

According to the 1931 census, biggest cities within the Voivodeship's boundaries were:

 Kraków (pop. 219,300),
 Tarnów (pop. 44,900),
 Nowy Sącz (pop. 30,300),
 Biala Krakowska (pop. 22,700),
 Jaworzno (pop. 19,100),
 Chrzanów (pop. 17,900),
 Zakopane (pop. 16,300),
 Bochnia (pop. 12,100),
 Oświęcim (pop. 12,000).

Voivodes
Kazimierz Junosza-Gałecki 1 September 1921 – 19 December 1923
Karol Olpiński 6 November 1923 – 16 November 1923 (acting)
Władysław Kowalikowski 16 November 1923 – 7 July 1926 (acting till 19 December 1923 or 8 March 1924 ?)
Ludwik Darowski 1 July 1926 – 31 December 1928
Mikołaj Kwaśniewski 1 January 1929 – 25 June 1935
Władysław Raczkiewicz 10 August 1935 – 13 October 1935
Kazimierz Świtalski 3 December 1935 – 20 April 1936
Michał Gnoiński 22 April 1936 – 8 September 1937
Józef Tymiński 9 September 1937 – September 1939

See also
Poland's current Lesser Poland Voivodeship

References
Maly rocznik statystyczny 1939, Nakladem Glownego Urzedu Statystycznego, Warszawa 1939 (Concise Statistical Year-Book of Poland, Warsaw 1939).

 
Former voivodeships of the Second Polish Republic
History of Lesser Poland Voivodeship
History of Podkarpackie Voivodeship